Muhammad Rozaimi bin Abdul Rahman (born 6 October 1992) is a retired Malaysian professional footballer who plays as a striker. He previously played for the defunct Sarawak, Sabah, Selangor, Kedah and Johor Darul Ta'zim II.

Rozaimi is a former Malaysian international and made his debut for the country against Sri Lanka in 2012. He rose to national prominence when he scored 10 goals in five appearances in the 2013 AFC U-22 Asian Cup qualification tournament while playing for the under-23 team, making him top scorer of the competition. He was listed as one of the top ten Asian players of 2012 by ESPN.

Club career 
Rozaimi began his career with Sarawak in 2010. He returned to Sabah in 2011 and made his Super League debut in 2–1 defeat against Terengganu. He scored his first Super League goal in away 1–1 draw against Perak.

Rozaimi along with Sabah President Cup squad, as Sabah U-23 squad, also played in the 2012 Sukma Games football tournament in Pahang, where he and the team achieved gold medal when they defeat Perak 3–0 in the final after extra time. Rozaimi himself scored in the final, and also helped to create the two other goals.

He agreed to join Selangor on a three-month loan for their 2012 Malaysia Cup campaign in August 2012, as Sabah failed to qualify for that tournament. On 4 September 2012, he score his only goal for Selangor in a 4-1 away win against Pahang.

Rozaimi joined Harimau Muda A for 2013 season on a loan. He did not play in any league in 2013 as Harimau Muda A were on a centralized training in Slovakia in a preparation for the 2013 Southeast Asian Games. He went back for Sabah for 2014–2015 season but his playing time was limited due to injury. Rozaimi ended his contract with Sabah in the 2015 season as he failed to fully recover from his injury.

He joined Johor Darul Takzim in 2016 and the club help him to recover from his injury. He played for the feeder team from 2017 until 2020. He won the 2019 Malaysia Challenge Cup with Johor Darul Ta'zim II. In 2021, he join Malaysian Super League club Kedah, playing only 9 league matches.

He return to Sabah in 2022 and elected as a scout for Sabah. He also joined an amateur team Tuaran and featured for them in the SAFA Sabah Cup. He scored the winning goal in the final against Tawau.

International career

Under-23 
In July 2011, Rozaimi receive his first national called up from Ong Kim Swee for an exhibition match against Chelsea. He received his second call up for Olympic qualification match against Syria. Rozaimi was included in the squad for 2013 AFC U-22 Asian Cup qualification and became a top-scorer in the competition with 10 goals. He scored four goals in the 7–0 win over the Philippines, two goal against Chinese Taipei, three goals against Vietnam and one goal against Myanmar although Malaysia failed to advance to next stage after losing two match against Myanmar and South Korea. His debut then attracting scouts from BEC-Tero Sasana and S.C. Beira-Mar, although the demands was rejected by his club of Sabah FA at the time.

Senior team 
On 28 April 2012, Rozaimi made his international debut in a friendly match against Sri Lanka.

Career statistics

Club

Statistics

International appearances

International goals

Personal life 
Rozaimi was born in Bongawan, Sabah, Malaysia. On 6 July 2015, while travelling with his cousin in the city of Kota Kinabalu, they were involved in a car accident. He survived the accident but seriously injured, while his cousin was killed. Through his recovering period, Rozaimi then launched his own barber shop located in Tanjung Aru, Kota Kinabalu, in September 2015.

Honours

Club
Johor Darul Ta'zim II
 Malaysia Challenge Cup: 2019

International 
 Merdeka Tournament: 2013

Individual 
 Best Young Players: 2012
 2013 AFC U-22 Asian Cup qualification top scorer: 10 goals
 2013 Merdeka Tournament Golden Boot winner: 3 goals
 ESPN Top Ten Asian Players of 2012

References 

1992 births
Living people
Malaysian people of Bruneian descent
Malaysian footballers
Malaysian people of Malay descent
Malaysia international footballers
Sarawak FA players
Sabah F.C. (Malaysia) players
Selangor FA players
Malaysia Super League players
People from Sabah
Association football wingers
Association football forwards